Wilfred Stott (18 March 1889 – 10 December 1973) was an Australian rules footballer who played with Essendon and Richmond in the Victorian Football League (VFL).	

Stott coached the Rutherglen Football Club in the Ovens and Murray Football League in 1925.

Notes

External links 
		

Tigerland Archive

1889 births
1973 deaths
VFL/AFL players born outside Australia
Australian rules footballers from Victoria (Australia)
Essendon Football Club players
Richmond Football Club players